Bury Your Roots is the fourth album by Kamchatka and contains 12 songs. The album was recorded and mixed by Tobias Strandvik and Kamchatka at Shrimpmonkey Studios and mastered by Johan Eckerblad at Mintelligence Studios.

Track listing
  "Perfect" (Andersson, Öjersson)
  "Hindsight" (Öjersson)
  "TV Blues" (Andersson, Öjersson)
  "The Same" (Öjersson)
  "Demonbelly" (Öjersson)
  "Good Night" (Andersson)
  "Bye Bye Mind's Eye" (Öjersson)
  "Puppet" (Andersson)
  "Before Things Get Rough" (Öjersson)
  "Worried" (Andersson)
  "I've Got To Learn" (Öjersson)
  "Bury Your Roots" (Öjersson)

Personnel

Band
Roger Öjersson – lead vocals & bass
Thomas "Juneor" Andersson – lead vocals & guitar
Tobias Strandvik – drums

Guest artists
Per Wiberg – keys on "Before Things Get Rough"
Daniel Norgren – saw on "Bye Bye Mind's Eye"
Marco Bylander – middle guitar solo on "Worried"

Credits
Lars Glendell – band photos
Hippograffix – cover art layout and design
Johan Eckerblad – mastering

2011 albums
Kamchatka (band) albums